Try Try Try may refer to:

 "Try, Try, Try", a 2000 song by The Smashing Pumpkins
 "Try Try Try" (Julian Cope song), 1995
 "Try" (Pink song)